Below is a list of notable footballers who have played for Newcastle United. Generally, this means players that have played 50–100 first-class matches for the club. However, some players who have played fewer matches are also included; this includes the club's founder members, players from the club's pre-Football League days, when they played fewer matches in a season than the present day, and some players who fell just short of the 100 total but made significant contributions to the club's history (e.g. Keegan, Ferdinand, Asprilla).

List of players

Players are listed according to the date they signed for the club. Appearances and goals are for first-team competitive matches only; wartime matches are excluded. Substitute appearances included.Statistics correct as of 3 September 2021.

Club captains

Hall of Fame

Source:

References

Newcastle United
 
Players
Association football player non-biographical articles